The Museum of the Chinese Communist Party is located at the intersection of Beichen East Road and Datun North Road, in Chaoyang District of Beijing, China. It is adjacent to the Olympic Green. The museum is managed by the Central Propaganda Department of the Chinese Communist Party.

History
After the 19th National Congress of the Chinese Communist Party, the Central Committee of the Chinese Communist Party decided to build a museum to fully display the history of the Chinese Communist Party (CCP). A total of seven design units received the design task, three were shortlisted, and the final winner was the scheme of Beijing Institute of Architectural Design Co., Ltd.. The construction project started on September 10, 2018, and was completed on May 5, 2021. More than 200 units and nearly 50,000 people participated.

On June 18, 2021, the museum officially opened. That same day, Xi Jinping, Li Keqiang, Li Zhanshu, Wang Yang, Wang Huning, Zhao Leji, Han Zheng, Wang Qishan and other party and state leaders visited the museum and reviewed the Chinese Communist Party Admission Oath.

Collections
There are 4,548 pieces or sets of cultural relics on permanent display in the museum, including 420 original state-level cultural relics, such as Karl Marx's Brussel IV notebook, Mao Zedong's coat and hat worn at the Proclamation of the People's Republic of China, the first Five-Star Red Flag of China raised by pressing the button, Mao Zedong's drafting and Zhou Enlai's handwritten inscription on the Monument to the People's Heroes, Li Dazhao's autobiography after his arrest and the gallows for his death, Chen Wangdao's translation of The Communist Manifesto and the Old Summer Palace bronze heads.

Architecture
From the birds-eye view, the museum shows the Chinese character "" shape as a whole, which means that the CCP is the vanguard of the Chinese working class, and also the vanguard of the Chinese people and the Chinese nation. The appearance adopts the traditional colonnade structure, which fully inherits the traditional essence of Chinese architecture. There are 28 pillars on the east and west sides of the museum, symbolizing the Communist Party of China's 28 years of bloody struggle to establish the People's Republic of China. There are six pillars on both sides of the north and the south.

Chang Shana, who participated in the design of the Great Hall of the People and the Cultural Palace of Nationalities, personally led the team to design the chapiters, pedestals, architraves, lattice walls, copper doors and emblem of the museum.

Lobby
In the lobby of the museum, there is a  lacquer painting of Ode to the Great Wall, which is made up of 100 lacquer boards. It was created by Cheng Xiangjun, a professor at the School of Arts of Tsinghua University.

References

Museums in Beijing
Museums established in 2021
2021 establishments in China
Buildings and structures in Chaoyang District, Beijing
History of the Chinese Communist Party